Mujhe Chand Chahiye (Urdu: مجھے چاند چاہیے) is a 2000 Pakistani Urdu-language romantic film which was released in March 2000. The film was Shaan's second directorial venture and was a huge success at the box office. 

The film's cast included Noor Bukhari, Moammar Rana, Atiqa Odho, Javed Sheikh and Reema. The movie's story revolved around the life of a divorced woman (Atiqa Odho) and her musician son (Shaan) who falls in love with a model (Noor).

Story summary
Mujhe Chand Chahiye is a romantic lighthearted comedy. Razi (Javed Sheikh) secretly marries a second wife Phool. Maima (Atiqa Odho), his first wife, splits up with him when she discovers it, and soon afterwards Maima leaves for Hong Kong, along with their young son, without informing her husband Razi. Years go by and Maima now has raised this son, Zain (Shaan Shahid) in Hong Kong, who falls in love with a visiting Pakistani model Chand (Noor Bukhari). He arrives in Pakistan and manages to secure a job as Chand's music teacher. Chand happens to be Razi's daughter with his second wife Phool. Imran (Moammar Rana) is also in love with Chand because he is one of her college friends.

Cast
Shaan as Zain
Noor as Chand
Moammar Rana as Imran
Reema as Zameen
Javed Sheikh as Razi
Atiqa Odho as Maima
Ismail Tara

Music

Sajjad Ali and his brother Raunaq Ali arranged music for the film and won Nigar Awards for it. Some of this film's better-known tracks include "Kal Shab Main Ne Dekha Chand Jharoke Mein" by Waris Baig, "Tujhey Dekha Tau Yoon Laga", "Jaan Bhi De Doon" and the sensational Punjabi track by Abrar-ul-Haq "Waan Kuttiya". The film's music was composed by the Pakistani pop singer Sajjad Ali.

Box office
The film completed 51 weeks at the main theater and thus crowned as a golden jubilee hit.

Awards

References

2000 films
2000s Urdu-language films
Pakistani romance films
Films directed by Shaan Shahid
Urdu-language Pakistani films
Films scored by Sajjad Ali